Tambour lace refers to a family of lace made by stretching a fine net over a frame (the eponymous Tambour, from the French for drum) and creating a chain stitch using a fine hook to reach through the net and draw the working thread through the net.

The chain-stitch embroidery was used extensively in the East—Persia, India, and China—many centuries ago but is thought not to have come to Europe until the seventeenth century. Little of it is heard of until the 1760s when translucent muslins from India, perhaps already tamboured with sprigs, were coming into fashion. 

In the second half of the eighteenth and the early nineteenth century, tambouring was a fashionable pastime for ladies of the French and English courts. It was usually done on fine muslin and was variously known as sewed muslin and flowered muslin.

Although tambour is often a surface embroidery, it is used in Limerick lace.

References

Needle lace